The Paterno is a mountain in the Dolomites on the border between South Tyrol and the Province of Belluno, Italy.

Gallery

References 
 Richard Goedeke: Sextener Dolomiten. (Alpine Club Guide) Bergverlag Rother, 1988.

External links 
 

Dolomites
Mountains of South Tyrol
Mountains of the Alps